Vallam kali (vaḷḷaṃ kaḷi, literally: boat game) also known as Snake Boat Race is a traditional boat race in Kerala, India. It is a form of canoe racing, and uses paddled war canoes. It is mainly conducted during the season of the harvest festival Onam in spring. Vallam kali includes races of many kinds of paddled longboats and 'snake boats'. Each team spends about 6 lakh rupees for the Nehru Trophy.

The race of chundan vallam ('snake boat', about 30-35 meter (100-120 feet) long with 64 or 128 paddlers aboard) is the major event and a major tourist attraction. Other types of boats which do participate in various events in the race are churulan vallam, iruttukuthy vallam, odi vallam, veppu vallam, vadakkanody vallam and kochu vallam. The Nehru Trophy Boat Race is a popular vallam kali event held in the Punnamada Lake near Alappuzha, Kerala, India.

In an effort to aggrandise this sport and showcase Kerala's backwaters to the world, the Government of Kerala initiated IPL style regatta named Champions Boat League in 2019.

History

In Kerala, during an early 13th-century war between the feudal kingdoms of Kayamkulam and Chembakassery, King Devanarayana of Chembakassery commissioned the construction of a war boat named Chundan Vallam and he tasked a famous carpenter of the day with the responsibility of creating it. Hence, the technical methods for creating these snake boats are around 8 centuries old. Of the snake boats still in use today, the Parthasarathi Chundan is the oldest model.

Vallam kali has mainly been conducted during the season of the harvest festival Onam in Autumn. The race of chundan vallam is the major event. Vallam kali also includes races of many other kinds of traditional paddled longboats of Kerala, and is one of the major tourist attractions in the state.

Vanchipattu
Vanchipattu (lit. 'boatsong') is the form of poetry in Malayalam language commonly used during vallam kali and related festivals. During Aranmula Uthrattadi Vallamkali, the vanchipattu is performed by the participants for its significance in the rituals. Ramapurathu Warrier is considered to be the pioneer of the vanchipattu.

List of periodical vallam kali events

Major events 

Kandassankadavu boat race, Thrissur
 Nehru Trophy Boat Race in Punnamada Lake, Alappuzha
Triprayar boat race, in Conolly canal, Triprayar, Thrissur
 Aranmula Uthrattadi Vallamkali at Aranmula, Pathanamthitta
 President's Trophy Boat Race in Ashtamudi lake, Kollam
 Kallada Boat Race in Kallada River, Kollam
 Pampa Boat Race in Neerattupuram
 Champakulam Moolam Boat Race
 Kumarakom Boat Race
 Payippad Jalotsavam
 Sree Narayana Boat Race in Karunagappally, Kollam
 Thazhathangadi Boat Race, Kottayam
 Gothuruth Boat Race, in the Periyar, Ernakulam
 Piravom Boat Race in Piravom
 Thuruthippuram Boat Race, in the Periyar, Ernakulam

Minor events 
 Paravur Jalothsavam & Boat Race in Paravur Thekkumbhagam, Kollam
 ATDC Boat Race, Alappuzha
 Rajiv Gandhi Trophy boat race, Pulinkunnu
 Neerettupuram Pampa Boat Race
 Karuvatta Boat Race
 Kavanattinkara Boat Race
 Kumarakom Arpookara Vanitha Jalamela, Kumarakom
 Mahatma Boat Race, Mannar, Alappuzha
 Kottapuram Boat Race, Kottappuram
 Kodungallur and Kumaranasan Smaraka Jalotsavam, Pallana
 Indira Gandhi Boat Race, in Kochi Lake
 Kaithappuzhakkayal Boat Race, in Kaithappuzha Lake, Ernakulam
 Biyyam Kaayal Boat Race, Ponnani
 Uthara malabar Boat Race, Thejaswini Lake, Kasaragod
 EK.Nayanar Trophy -Malabar jalolsavam, Mangalassery, Kuppam river, Kannur district
 Kuppam Boat Race, Kuppam River, Kannur District
 Kattampally Boat Race, Kannur District
 Madayi Boat Race, Pazhyangadi River, Pazhyangadi, Kannur District

See also
Sport in India - overview of Sports in India.
Chundan Vallam
Aranmula Kottaram
Kerala backwaters

References

External links

 Dates of the various races and other useful traveller information
 The great snake boat race of India
 Champions Boat League
 Aranmula
 Nehru Trophy Boat Race
 Google video of Vallamkalli
 Online game on Vallamkali at www.gamezindia.com
 Snake Boat Race
 Gothuruth Boat Race since 1938

Paddling
Boat races in Kerala
Traditional sports of India
Tourism in Kerala